

Animals

A maned wolf, a mammal natively known as "kalak" to the Toba people.

Locations

Kalak or Kelek or Kelak or Kalek may refer to:
Kələk, a municipality in Azerbaijan
Kelak, Alborz, a village in Iran
Kalak, Bushehr, a village in Iran
Kalak, Gilan, a village in Iran
Kalak-e Amjadi, Kermanshah Province, a village in Iran
Kalek-e Bayeh, Kermanshah Province, a village in Iran
Kalek-e Olya, Kermanshah Province, a village in Iran
Kalak-e Sar Bisheh, Kohgiluyeh and Boyer-Ahmad Province, a village in Iran
Kalak, Lorestan, a village in Iran
Kalak, Chalus, Mazandaran Province, Iran
Kalak, Ramsar, a village in Iran
Kalak, Sari, a village in Iran
Kelak-e Olya, Mazandaran Province, Iran
Kelak-e Sofla, Mazandaran Province, Iran
Kalak, Iranshahr, Sistan and Baluchestan Province, Iran
Kalak, South Khorasan, a village in Iran
Kelak, Tehran, a village in Iran
Kalak-e Naqi, a village in Iran
Kalak Jafar, a village in Iran
Kalak Khan, a village in Iran

Music
Kalak (album), by Sarathy Korwar

See also
Kalak Darreh (disambiguation)
Kolak